Châu Thành is a rural district (huyện) of Sóc Trăng province in the Mekong River Delta region of Vietnam. It's a new district and established in 2008. Many district in other southern Vietnam province also named "Châu Thành". As of 2008 the district had a population of 236.324. The district covers an area of 103,518 km². The district capital is Châu Thành Town.

Towns and communes
Châu Thành Town
An Ninh
An Hiệp
Phú Tân
Phú Tâm
Thiện Mỹ

References

Districts of Sóc Trăng province